Daniel Jimmy Viteri Vinces (born December 12, 1981 in Guayaquil) is an Ecuadoran footballer.

Club career
Viteri began his club career at Guayaquil-based club Emelec. He later moved to Deportivo Quito. At both clubs, he defended their goals prolifically. In 2008, he moved to then national champions L.D.U. Quito. At the club, he was the back-up to legendary goalkeeper José Francisco Cevallos. As a result, he saw little playing time, but was the reserve goalkeeper for the squads that won the 2008 Copa Libertadores, 2009 Recopa Sudamericana, and the 2009 Copa Sudamericana. In 2010, he moved back to Guayaquil, this time to play for Barcelona. For 2011, he will return to L.D.U. Quito.

International career
He has played for the Ecuador national football team and was a participant at the 2002 FIFA World Cup.
Then coach Luis Fernando Suarez called Viteri up for the first 2 matches of the CONMEBOL World Cup Qualifiers in 2007 after injuries to both Marcelo Elizaga and Javier Klimowicz. He played the full matches against Venezuela and Brazil, respectively, losing both matches. Against Venezuela, Viteri failed to reach a half-field free-kick by Jose Manuel Rey. It proved to be the game-winner in the shock 1-0 upset at home. He has not been called up since.

Honors
Emelec
Serie A: 2001, 2002
L.D.U. Quito
Copa Libertadores: 2008
Copa Sudamericana: 2009
Recopa Sudamericana: 2009

References

 Player's FEF Card
 (El Comercio article)

1981 births
Living people
Ecuadorian footballers
Ecuador international footballers
2002 FIFA World Cup players
Association football goalkeepers
C.S. Emelec footballers
S.D. Quito footballers
L.D.U. Quito footballers
Barcelona S.C. footballers
Guayaquil City F.C. footballers
Sportspeople from Guayaquil